Sangan (also Romanized as Sangān; also known as Kalāteh-i-Amīri, Kalāteh-ye Amiri, and Sangān-e Pā’īn) is a village in Arabkhaneh Rural District, Shusef District, Nehbandan County, South Khorasan Province, Iran. At the 2006 census, its population was 21, in 5 families.

References 

Populated places in Nehbandan County